The 1958 Milwaukee Braves season was the sixth in Milwaukee and the 88th overall season of the franchise. The Braves finished first in the National League with a 92–62 record and returned to the World Series for the second consecutive year, losing to the New York Yankees in seven games. The Braves set a Major League record which still stands for the fewest players caught stealing in a season, with 8.

Offseason
 December 1, 1958: Claude Raymond was drafted from the Braves by the Chicago White Sox in the 1958 rule 5 draft.
 Prior to 1958 season: Manny Jiménez was acquired by the Braves from Ciudad Juárez.
 Prior to 1958 season: In an unusual turn of events for a World Series champion, Braves' manager Fred Haney replaced all four members of his 1957 coaching staff after the Fall Classic triumph: third-base coach Connie Ryan, first-base coach Johnny Riddle, pitching coach Charlie Root, and bullpen coach Bob Keely. Root and Keely were holdovers from Charlie Grimm's staff, while Ryan was a former infielder and minor league manager for the Braves. Haney replaced them with Billy Herman, John Fitzpatrick, Whit Wyatt and George Susce. Herman and Wyatt were recruited from the Dodgers and Phillies respectively, and Susce was a veteran bullpen coach from the American League. Fitzpatrick had previously coached for Haney with the Pirates and in the Pacific Coast League.

Regular season

Season summary 
The core of the Braves team was once again Hank Aaron, Eddie Mathews, Joe Adcock, Warren Spahn, and Lew Burdette. Also, outfielder Bill Bruton came back from his season-ending injury in 1957 to play in 100 games. Aaron led the team with 196 hits, 109 runs scored, .326 batting average and 95 runs batted in, and Mathews led the team with 31 home runs.

However, in 1958 the Braves' third starting pitcher, Bob Buhl, was injured after pitching in just 11 games (winning five), which put even more pressure on Spahn, Burdette, and their manager Fred Haney to be able to win. Also, because of injuries, Adcock played in only 105 games, and Wes Covington played in just 90. Red Schoendienst played in just 106 games, including many as just a pinch hitter, and it was discovered the next year that he had tuberculosis. In this difficult situation, Spahn posted a 22–11 record in 290 innings pitched and 23 complete games, and Burdette had a 20–10 record in 275.1 innings.

The Braves repeated as the National League champions, this time by a margin of eight games over the Pittsburgh Pirates. The New York Yankees again won the American League, hence the two teams faced off against each other again in the World Series. The Braves roared ahead by winning three of the first four games for a 3–1 lead in the series. However, the Yankees regrouped and won games five, six, and seven—the final two in Milwaukee County Stadium, the Braves' home stadium—to win the World Championship.

Season standings

Record vs. opponents

Opening Day lineup

Notable transactions
 June 13, 1958: Carl Sawatski was traded by the Braves to the Philadelphia Phillies for Joe Lonnett.

Roster

Player stats

Batting

Starters by position
Note: Pos = Position; G = Games played; AB = At bats; H = Hits; Avg. = Batting average; HR = Home runs; RBI = Runs batted in

Other batters
Note: G = Games played; AB = At bats; H = Hits; Avg. = Batting average; HR = Home runs; RBI = Runs batted in

Pitching

Starting pitchers
Note: G = Games pitched; IP = Innings pitched; W = Wins; L = Losses; ERA = Earned run average; SO = Strikeouts

Other pitchers
Note: G = Games pitched; IP = Innings pitched; W = Wins; L = Losses; ERA = Earned run average; SO = Strikeouts

Relief pitchers
Note: G = Games pitched; W = Wins; L = Losses; SV = Saves; ERA = Earned run average; SO = Strikeouts

1958 World Series

Game 1
October 1, 1958, at Milwaukee County Stadium in Milwaukee, Wisconsin

Game 2
October 2, 1958, at Milwaukee County Stadium in Milwaukee, Wisconsin

Game 3
October 4, 1958, at Yankee Stadium in New York City

Game 4
October 5, 1958, at Yankee Stadium in New York City

Game 5
October 6, 1958, at Yankee Stadium in New York City

Game 6
October 8, 1958, at Milwaukee County Stadium in Milwaukee, Wisconsin

Game 7
October 9, 1958, at Milwaukee County Stadium in Milwaukee, Wisconsin

Awards and honors

1958 Major League Baseball All-Star Game
Starters: Hank Aaron, Del Crandall, and Warren Spahn
Reserves: Eddie Mathews, Don McMahon

Farm system

LEAGUE CHAMPIONS: Cedar Rapids, Yakima, Boise, Midland

Notes

References

Milwaukee Braves team page at Baseball Reference

Milwaukee Braves seasons
Milwaukee Braves season
National League champion seasons
Milwau